The 12th Arabian Gulf Cup was held in the UAE, in November 1994.

The tournament was won by Saudi Arabia for the first time

Iraq were banned from the tournament because of invasion of Kuwait in 1990.

Tournament

The teams played a single round-robin style competition. The team achieving first place in the overall standings was the tournament winner.

Result

References

1994
1994 in Asian football
1994
1994 in Emirati sport
1994–95 in Qatari football
1994–95 in Bahraini football
1994–95 in Saudi Arabian football
1994–95 in Kuwaiti football
1994–95 in Omani football
1994–95 in Emirati football